Henry Cow Box is a seven-CD limited edition box set by English avant-rock group Henry Cow. It was released in December 2006 by Recommended Records and comprises the six original albums Henry Cow released between 1973 and 1979, including those recorded with Slapp Happy. A bonus 3" CD-single was given to advance subscribers of the box set which contains previously unreleased material taken from live performances in Europe by the Orckestra, a merger of Henry Cow, the Mike Westbrook Brass Band and folk singer Frankie Armstrong in 1977. The two bonus CD Orckestra tracks were later reissued on the 2019 Henry Cow Box Redux: The Complete Henry Cow bonus CD, Ex Box – Collected Fragments 1971–1978.

The CDs featured here are the 1998 to 2006 reissues by Recommended Records and contain the original LP mixes. (Remixed versions of Legend, Unrest and In Praise of Learning were issued in 1991 by East Side Digital Records.) Concerts and Western Culture include the bonus tracks present on their respective CD reissues. The box set's album covers are CD-sized cardboard replicas of the original LP covers.

Cover art

The album cover art work was by artist Ray Smith and was originally used on Henry Cow's debut album, Legend (1973).

Track listings

Disc 1: Legend
Contains all the tracks (the US/Japanese vinyl mixes) from the Henry Cow LP, Legend (1973).

Disc 2: Unrest
Contains all the tracks from the Henry Cow LP, Unrest (1974).

Disc 3: Desperate Straights
Contains all the tracks from the Slapp Happy/Henry Cow LP, Desperate Straights (1975).

Disc 4: In Praise of Learning
Contains all the tracks (the original mixes) from the Henry Cow/Slapp Happy LP, In Praise of Learning (1975).

Discs 5 and 6: Concerts
Contains all the tracks from the Henry Cow double LP (with Robert Wyatt), Concerts (1976), plus the Henry Cow tracks on the double LP, Greasy Truckers Live at Dingwalls Dance Hall (1974).

{{tracklist
| headline  = Disk 6
| title1 = Oslo"
"Part 1"
"Part 2"
"Part 3"
"Part 4"
"Part 5"
"Part 6"
"Part 7"
"Part 8
| writer1 = Henry Cow
| length1 = 29:00
5:38
3:16
3:24
3:01
3:00
1:45
4:55
4:01
| title9 = Off the Map"
"Solo Piano"
"Trio
|writer9 = Hodgkinson, Cutler, Frith
Hodgkinson
Hodgkinson, Cutler, Frith
| length9 = 8:23
| title10 = Café Royal
| note10 = solo guitar
| writer10 = Frith
| length10 = 3:20
| title11 = Keeping Warm in Winter
| writer11 = Frith, Greaves
| length11 = 1:00
| title12 = Sweet Heart of Mine
| writer12 = Henry Cow
| length12 = 8:58
| title13 = Udine
| writer13 = Henry Cow
| length13 = 9:39
}}

Disc 7: Western Culture
Contains all the tracks from the Henry Cow LP, Western Culture (1979).

Bonus 3" CD-single: "Unreleased Orckestra Extract"
Contains previously unreleased material taken from live performances in Europe by the Orckestra in March–May 1978. Given to advance subscribers of the box set.

Personnel

Henry Cow
Fred Frith – guitars, violin, viola, xylophone, piano, voice
Tim Hodgkinson – organ, piano, alto saxophone, clarinet, Hawaiian guitar, voice
John Greaves – bass guitar, piano, voice
Chris Cutler – drums, piano, voice
Geoff Leigh – saxophones, flute, clarinet, recorder, voice
Lindsay Cooper – bassoon, flute, oboe, soprano saxophone, sopranino recorder, piano, voice
Dagmar Krause – voice, piano
Georgie Born – bass guitar

Slapp Happy
Dagmar Krause – voice
Peter Blegvad – guitar, voice, clarinet
Anthony Moore – piano, electronics and tapework

The Orckestra
Henry Cow
Fred Frith – guitar
Tim Hodgkinson – organ, alto saxophone
Chris Cutler – drums
Lindsay Cooper – bassoon
Dagmar Krause – vocals
Georgie Born – bass guitar
Mike Westbrook Brass Band
Mike Westbrook – piano
Kate Westbrook – euphonium
Dave Chambers – soprano saxophone
Paul Rutherford – trombone
Phil Minton – vocals, trumpet
Frankie Armstrong – vocals

See also
The 40th Anniversary Henry Cow Box Set (2009)

Footnotes

Henry Cow albums
2006 compilation albums
Recommended Records compilation albums